Dreams Come True is the third official album release by singer and songwriter Judee Sill. A double CD released on Water Records in 2005, the album mainly contains work originally recorded in the seventies as potential material for a third album on Asylum Records. A combination of Sill's health and drug problems and lack of interest in the market prevented the completion of the album in the seventies but a renewed interest in her work led to the release of this set, which also includes film footage from 1973.

Songs
Despite the lack of commercial success for Sill's two albums Judee Sill and Heart Food, which led to the end of her contract to Asylum Records and the end of her association with David Geffen, Sill's music was critically acclaimed and she continued to write songs.

Sill recorded early versions for a planned third album, Dreams Come True, in 1974 at Mike Nesmith's studios. Songs like "That's the Spirit" and "Things are Lookin' Up" show a more carefree approach in comparison to Sill's earlier songs, especially considering her frustration at her lack of commercial success.

The songs remained unfinished, but Jim O'Rourke undertook the task of mixing the material. He said: "I never thought to try and equal those (earlier recordings) except in spirit, how she seemed to like the colour of her instruments. I  wanted the music to stand on its own and to be about nothing other than itself. And the moment of soloing up Judee's vocal track was, frankly, eerie. . . a serious thing! Not to be taken lightly." 

The second disc is made up of rarities and home demos, including one of Sill's earliest songs, "Dead Time Bummer Blues", written about her experience in jail, which was recorded by the Los Angeles garage band the Leaves. It also features an early version of "Things are Lookin' Up", entitled "Sunny Side Up Luck", performed by Sill on clavinet in 1973.

Track listing
All tracks by Judee Sill except where noted

Disc 1
"That's the Spirit" – 4:18 
"I'm Over" – 3:38
"Apocalypse Express" – 2:48 
"Living End" – 3:01
"Things are Lookin' Up" – 3:17
"Good Ship Omega" – 3:28
"Last Resort" – 2:33
"Til Dreams Come True" – 3:29
"Living End" (demo) – 4:08 
"I'm Over" (demo) – 4:20
"Til Dreams Come True" (instrumental demo) – 3:24

Disc 2
"Dead Time Bummer Blues" – 2:30
"Sunny Side Up Luck" – 5:06 
"Emerald River Dance" – 3:10
"Waterfall" – 3:09
"North Country" (Traditional) – 3:12
"Farmer's Daughter (The Chickens in the Garden)" (Traditional) – 1:10
"Wreck of the FFV (Fast Flying Vestibule)" (Traditional) – 3:13
"500 Miles" (Hedy West) – 2:01
"Oh Boy The Magician" (instrumental) – 7:42

Personnel 

Susan Armezzani – research, transcription
James Armstrong – advisor
Pat Blessing – video producer
Lyn Gaza – editing, effects
Judy Himmel – portrait photography
Gary Hobish – mastering
Art Johnson – arranger, electric guitar, backing vocals
Kevin Kelly – drums, backing vocals
Phred Lender – programming, authoring
Marc McClure – backing vocals, vocal  arrangement, bottleneck guitar
Vicki McClure – backing vocals
Jim O'Rourke – mixing
Shannon Peltier – backing vocals
Tommy Peltier – guitar, backing vocals, engineer, photography
Bill Plummer – backing vocals, producer, bass
Wesley Pouliot – portrait photography
Emitt Rhodes – coordination, track engineer
Patrick Roques – producer, art direction, design, photography
Filippo Salvadori – executive producer
Judee Sill – acoustic guitar, piano, arranger, vocals, backing vocals, voices, clavinet, farfisa organ, vocal arrangement, paintings, sketches
Pat Thomas – executive producer
Russ Tolman – copy editing

References

External links
Judee Sill, Dreams Come True

2005 albums
Albums published posthumously
Judee Sill albums